Patrick Gerald McKenna, DL, FIBMS, FRSB, MRIA (born 10 December 1953), known informally and widely as Gerry McKenna, is a Chartered Biologist (CBiol, 1982) and Chartered Scientist (CSci, 2006) from Northern Ireland.

Professor McKenna is most well known for his long affiliation with the University of Ulster in Coleraine, where he was honoured with the Freedom of the Borough of Coleraine and as Coleraine Business Person of the Year, as well as being appointed Deputy Lieutenant and later Vice Lord Lieutenant for County Londonderry.

University of Ulster leadership
During McKenna's successive tenures as founding Director of the Biomedical Sciences Research Centre, Head of Biological & Biomedical Sciences, Dean of Science, Pro Vice Chancellor (Research), and finally Vice Chancellor/President of the University of Ulster, the university became the foremost provider of healthcare programs (both undergraduate and postgraduate), and was top-ranked for research (5*) in Biomedical Sciences and Celtic Studies in the UK, one of only 20 universities to have two 5* ratings. It also became the largest university on the island of Ireland.
The university rose to 27th in Quality Research Funding (research power) in the UK and was shortlisted for Sunday Times University of the Year.

McKenna has strongly promoted social inclusion, most notably via the acclaimed 'Step Up' program for school pupils from disadvantaged backgrounds. He also established a range of e-learning programs via Campus One.

Founder or co-founder
Heads of University Centres of Biomedical Sciences (HUCBMS)
Universities Ireland
US-Ireland R&D Partnership.
Irish Universities Nutrition Alliance (IUNA)
Catalyst Inc (formerly Northern Ireland Science Park)
Benburb Priory Library & Museum
Benburb Priory Ltd
Order of Mary Servite Trust
Celtic Academies Alliance

Affiliations and honours
 Chair, Health Technology and Informatics Advisory Committee; Biomedical Sciences Advisor; Hong Kong Polytechnic University
 Chair, Management Board of the Benburb Servite Priory Library and Museum
 Chair, Benburb Priory Ltd
 Chair, Board of Order of Mary Servite Trust and Chair of Finance Committee
 Member, Quality Assurance Agency for Higher Education Benchmarking Working Groups for Biosciences and Biomedical Sciences
 Member, Advisory Committee, Faculty of Health and Social Sciences, Hong Kong Polytechnic University
 Member, International Advisory Board, University of Kufa
 Chair, Universities Ireland
 Keys to the City of Portland, Maine
 Honoree, Harvard Friends of Celtic Studies and the Flax Trust America, New York City
 Honorary Doctorates, National University of Ireland (NUI) and Queen's University Belfast
 Chair, Northern Ireland Foresight, Life and Health Technologies Panel
 Chair, Independent Advisory Group, Doctoral Training Alliance
 Co-chair, Royal Irish Academy Brexit Taskforce
 Chair, Royal Irish Academy, North-South Standing Committee
 Chair, Royal Irish Academy, Higher Education Futures Taskforce
 Senior Vice President, Vice President, Member, Member of Council, Royal Irish Academy
 President, President Emeritus, Hon Executive Secretary, Heads of University Centres of Biomedical Sciences (HUCBMS)
 Vice Lord Lieutenant for County Londonderry

External links
Website: Professor P. G. (Gerry) McKenna - Home

References

 

1953 births
Date of birth missing (living people)
Academics from Northern Ireland
Educators from Northern Ireland
Scientists from Northern Ireland
Vice-Chancellors of Ulster University
People from County Londonderry
Deputy Lieutenants of Londonderry
Members of the Royal Irish Academy
Fellows of the Royal Society of Biology
Living people
20th-century educators from Northern Ireland
21st-century educators from Northern Ireland